The Red Lanterns (translit. Ta Kokkina fanaria) is a 1963 Greek drama film directed by Vasilis Georgiadis and based on a play by Alekos Galanos. It was nominated for the Academy Award for Best Foreign Language Film. It was also entered into the 1964 Cannes Film Festival.

Plot
The film begins with a happy couple, Eleni and Petros, at an amusement park in Athens, celebrating their affair. Some time later, Eleni and Petros are together again on a beautiful day, but she has to go and so she leaves for her secret workplace: The Red Lanterns.

There, Eleni and many other girls work as prostitutes. They look out of God's path but they are sensitive and kindhearted. Every one of them has her own story: Eleni, the protagonist, originates from Romania and travelled to Greece looking for a better life; however, because of choices she has made she is now the most famous of the prostitutes. Anna is a young woman in love with Captain Nicholas. She has a child with him but he doesn't know. Mary (Mairi Chronopoulou) is the eldest of them and the most "masculine" in manners. A young customer named Angelos falls in love with her and soon they begin a passionate love affair. Marina, a girl from a village far away from Athens, is madly in love with Doris, her "manager". All of them work in the home of Madam Pari (Despo Diamantidou), a professional madam and former prostitute herself. Katerina is a kindhearted, poor, abused and ignored cleaning woman and servant there. She is married to an old man who is institutionalized. Michalis is Eleni's "manager" and also in love with her; however, she hates him.

Soon, another woman joins their "home." Myrsine is a 16-year-old girl who becomes one of them after being pursued by a cop. Michalis tries to seduce her but doesn't succeed. After Captain Nicholas leaves, Anna tells Helen that she has a child with him and that no one knows. Anna then tells her son Alex the truth about his father and waits for Captain Nicholas' return. On Christmas Eve, Angelos proposes to Mary, but she, laughingly, rejects him. Doris leaves Marina, who is crying and screaming, threatening to kill herself.

Eleni arrives at the Christmas party after having had a romantic dinner with Petros. Petros follows her and when he discovers her secret he beats her. Crying, she tries to explain everything, but he leaves crying, too. After everything that's happened, The Red Lanterns close down. Anna awaits a letter from Captain Nicholas, but she discovers that the entire Eternal Ship crew, including Captain Nicholas, died in a storm. Mary, Marina, and Myrsine try to find a place of their own so they can continue working. Michalis once again tries to seduce Eleni, but she and Petros reunite and are happier than ever. The movie ends with Katerina leaving the Red Lanterns with her husband, poor but happy. He asks her, "Isn't life beautiful?" to which she responds "It's fine."

Cast
 Tzeni Karezi - Eleni Nicoleskou
 Giorgos Foundas - Michailos
 Dimitris Papamichael - Petros
 Alexandra Ladikou - Anna Georganta
 Manos Katrakis - Captain Nicholas
 Mary Chronopoulou - Mary Pana
 Phaedon Georgitsis - Angelos
 Despo Diamantidou - Madam Pari
 Eleni Anousaki - Myrsine
 Katerina Helmy - Marina Georgiadou
 Kostas Kourtis - Doris
 Yro Kyriakaki - Katerina
 Notis Peryalis - old man

See also
 List of submissions to the 36th Academy Awards for Best Foreign Language Film
 List of Greek submissions for the Academy Award for Best Foreign Language Film

References

External links

1963 films
1963 drama films
Films set in Greece
Greek drama films
1960s Greek-language films
Greek films based on plays
Greek black-and-white films
Films directed by Vasilis Georgiadis
Films about prostitution